Zdzislaw Wesołowski (23 March 1927 – 2 April 1983) was a Polish footballer. He played in one match for the Poland national football team in 1951.

References

External links
 

1927 births
1983 deaths
Polish footballers
Poland international footballers
Place of birth missing
Association footballers not categorized by position